This page is about a college in Northern Ireland. For institutions with similar names, see United Theological College, Union Theological Seminary and Union School of Theology

Union Theological College is the theological college for the Presbyterian Church in Ireland and is situated in Belfast, Northern Ireland.  It is governed by the Council for Training in Ministry. It has been responsible for training people for ministry in the Presbyterian Church in Ireland and also runs courses open to the wider public.

The college currently offers three residential courses at undergraduate, postgraduate, and PhD levels, and five distance learning postgraduate courses in Theology through BibleMesh. The professors of the college constitute the Presbyterian Theological Faculty of Ireland (PTFI) which was granted a Royal Charter in 1881 to confer postgraduate academic degrees.  A Supplemental Charter was granted in 2021 to modernise the original charter. In October 2021, the college established a partnership with St Mary's University, Twickenham, to accredit undergraduate degrees. This followed a time of controversy when the Professor of Church History was dismissed for “gross misconduct” and Queen's University Belfast broke its long-standing links with the college.

History

The Assembly’s College 

The college was founded in 1853 as the Assembly’s College. The Renaissance Revival style building with its grand Doric porch and Baroque attic was designed by Sir Charles Lanyon, the architect of the main building at Queen’s and built with Scrabo stone at a cost of £5,000. Merle d’Aubigné of Geneva participated in the opening ceremony on 5 December 1853 alongside Henry Cooke, President of the Faculty (the five other professors in the new college were John Edgar, Robert Wilson, William Killen, James G. Murphy and William Gibson).

There was a large influx of students in the wake of the 1859 Revival and the south wing with its dining hall and student accommodation (“Chambers”) was added in 1869. Princeton seminary had an important influence in the shaping of the ethos of the college during this period: the Rev. Roberts Watts who was appointed Professor of Systematic Theology in 1866 hoped to make “Belfast another Princeton”. The north wing with its wood-panelled chapel was designed by John Lanyon, son of original architect, and completed in 1881. The first degrees under the Royal Charter were conferred in 1883. However, the death of Watts in 1895 marked the beginning of the end of the Princetonian influence. A partial union took place between the faculties in Belfast and Magee in 1922.

The newly formed Parliament of Northern Ireland met in the Assembly’s College from 1921 until 1932 while Stormont was being built: the Commons met in the Gamble Library and the Senate in the college chapel. During this period the college conducted classes in a house and provided library resources in a house on University Square.

In 1926 the college became a Recognised College of Queen’s University but the college then came under criticism for its embrace of theological liberalism. This culminated in a charge of heresy being brought against Professor J. Ernest Davey in 1926-27 and a heresy trial in 1927 because of his teaching in the College. The five charges were summarised in the minutes of the General Assembly as follows:

 The first charge alleges that Professor Davey denies that ‘God pardoneth all our sins and accepteth us as righteous in His sight, only for the righteousness of Christ imputes to us.’
 The second charge alleges that Professor Davey taught what is contrary to Holy Scripture concerning the absolute perfection of our Lord's character.
 The third charge alleges that Professor Davey taught what is contrary to the Word of God and the Westminster Confession of Faith regarding the inspiration, infallibility, and Divine authority of Holy Scriptures,
 The fourth charge alleges that Professor Davey taught what is contrary to the doctrine that ‘the sinfulness of all sins proceedeth only from the creature and not from God.’
 The fifth charge alleges that Professor Davey held and taught that the doctrine of the Trinity is not taught in the Word of God.

Although cleared by the Church’s courts, a small number of Presbyterians broke away unhappy with the decision and founded what later became the Evangelical Presbyterian Church.

The college officially reopened in October 1932 and the inaugural lecture was delivered by the Scottish Historian Robert Rait. Between 1941 and 1948 the city police used the college as its own headquarters were bombed in the Belfast Blitz. In 1953, to mark the College’s centenary year, Prof. Davey was elected Moderator of the General Assembly.

The Union Theological College 

In 1976 theological teaching at Magee College in Derry ceased and the two colleges amalgamated in 1978. The new college, constituted by an Act of Parliament, was named the Union Theological College. John M. Barkley was Professor of Church History from 1954 until his retirement in 1981 (Principal 1976-1981) and was succeeded by Finlay Holmes (Principal 1987-1992). Laurence Kirkpatrick was subsequently appointed Professor of Church history in 1996 (Principal 2008-2010).

In 2003 the college celebrated its 150th anniversary by completing a £2.8million pound refurbishment in which individual study bedrooms with ensuite facilities were added. Alister E. McGrath, Professor of Historical Theology at the University of Oxford gave a public lecture entitled “Renewing our vision for the future of Protestant Christianity in Northern Ireland”.  Bill Addley retired as Professor of Practical Theology in 2006 and the vacated chair was filled by Drew Gibson. Cecil McCullough, Professor of New Testament, who served as Principal from 1998-2002, retired in 2007 and was succeeded in the chair by Gordon Campbell.

On 14 November 2009 a fire caused serious damage to the rear of the college during the refurbishment of the Principal’s House (a £2.2million project). The extension known as the Training Resource Centre, providing further lecture and seminar rooms, was subsequently opened in September 2011. Stafford Carson was appointed as a new executive principal in 2013. At this time a major stonework restoration and conservation project took place  (2013-2017). Patton Taylor retired as Professor of Old Testament in 2016 (Principal 2002-2008 and 2010-2013).

In 2017 the college marked the 500th anniversary of the Reformation by participating in a “Luther 500” conference and by hosting an autumn seminar series entitled “The Unfinished Reformation”. The Welsh Presbyterian theologian Stephen N. Williams, who had held the Chair of Systematic Theology from 1994, was succeeded in 2017 by Michael McClenahan.

In 2018 there was “a refresh of the College’s Coat of Arms” with the help of a digital heraldic artist, including discussion of the motto to “buy the truth and sell it not”.  The shield of this coat of arms was then incorporated into a new logo, featuring two drinking horns above a burning bush.  The logo was changed again in 2022, emphasising the year of the college’s foundation but removing the motto.

Breaking of links with Queen's University Belfast 
In 2016, Queen’s University Belfast undertook a strategic review of the teaching of Theology as all new undergraduate students were then taught at Union Theological College, noting decline in the overall number of students studying theology at the four Theological Colleges, and expressing concerns regarding the diversity of provision compared to Theology and Religions departments in other UK Universities, while also highlighting “excellent student satisfaction rates” and recommending that future plans include “as many aspects of its current undergraduate provision via UTC as possible (community-mindedness, well-cared for student body, a fine library and library culture, and a real sense of the scholastics in ministry).”

In 2018 the Professor of Church History was controversially suspended pursuant to his participation in a radio interview. A subsequent QAA report that was described by journalists as “highly critical” expressed concerns regarding “weakness in the college’s maintenance of academic standards”, with “the potential to put academic standards and quality at risk”.

In 2019, Queen’s University Belfast Senate approved a recommendation from the Academic Council regarding the Institute of Theology, with the result that the University would no longer offer Theology degrees, ending its relationship with all four Theological Colleges in the Institute of Theology, including Union Theological College. As tuition fees for 2018/19 were set at £4,160 annually, the projected annual financial shortfall to the college was estimated to be as high as £700,000 on the assumption that over 150 undergraduate students might normally be admitted in a given year. While student numbers enrolled in the colleges of the Institute of Theology had declined significantly in latter years, numbers in the College had seen a smaller decrease, from 264 in 2012 to 233 in 2017. It was subsequently argued that the immediately foreseeable shortfall in the absence of any new income streams would be £250,000 by 2022.

Until 2021, the college had provided teaching and assessment for undergraduate and postgraduate awards offered through the Institute of Theology at Queen’s University Belfast. Whereas a wider range of modules was offered to students in the past, previously including a “Graduate Certificate in Youth Ministry programme”, the range of available modules had latterly been restricted “for reasons of financial viability”.

Diversity of staff 
One of the concerns raised by the Strategic Review carried out by Queen’s University Belfast in 2016 was a lack of diversity in the faculty. It was noted that “there are now no full-time female members of staff teaching on the undergraduate programmes” and that the full-time teaching staff “are all male and from a Presbyterian background”, with a requirement that they “be committed to working within the Christian ethos and doctrinal framework of the Presbyterian Church in Ireland”. It was also noted that any Professorial appointment must be an ordained minister in the Church, or eligible to become such.

According to the report of a QAA monitoring visit in May 2021, “the college reports that it has had no relevant staff vacancies,” yet three such vacancies were advertised shortly thereafter with just over a week’s notice of the associated application deadline. The new faculty appointments were then announced in August 2021, consisting of two men and a woman who is a member of Hill Street Presbyterian congregation in Lurgan, where the convenor of the Council for Training in Ministry also happens to be the minister.

Dismissal of a professor 
Considerable public controversy was generated latterly when the Professor of Church History and former principal, Laurence Kirkpatrick,  whose teaching demonstrably inspired previous students, was suspended following his participation in a radio interview in June 2018. Then in March 2019 a church disciplinary panel found him guilty of “gross misconduct” and he was summarily dismissed after 22 years of teaching. The panel highlighted his contribution to a Talkback radio programme on 13 June 2018 which allegedly “brought Union Theological College and by association, [his] employer, the Presbyterian Church in Ireland into disrepute” and “had a significant and material adverse impact on PCI’s relationship with Queen's University Belfast and caused hurt and damage to the faculty's relationship and cohesion.” Rev. Professor Kirkpatrick ostensibly “failed to gain the church's approval for taking part” in the interview, was described as having publicly disagreed with “the doctrinal position of [his] employer”, and purportedly made no attempt to defend the college’s reputation. Of particular contention, the erstwhile Professor of Church History responded to a hypothetical question during the Talkback interview by stating that he personally “would be horrified” if students were presented with only one view on questions of sexual ethics in an academic setting, as well as saying that he would be “heartbroken” if anyone accused him of being “bigoted against Catholic students or gay students or whatever”, arguing that “as near as possible we uphold everything that the university stands for”. The sacking of a professor on such grounds in turn prompted far more widespread media coverage and public criticism than any comments previously made during the original radio interview. In particular, this was independently interpreted at the time as “stifling public debate” and curtailing “academic freedom” by undermining academics in their “ability to express a range of opinions”, although the Clerk of the Presbyterian Church in Ireland denied that ministers were being silenced. In contrast to published accusations of “gross misconduct” for participation in a radio interview, a formerly suspended Presbyterian minister who was subsequently sentenced for soliciting, possessing and distributing indecent images of children was not similarly accused of “gross misconduct” in ensuing reports to the General Assembly, church authorities having instead withheld information regarding relevant offences from the perpetrator’s former congregations after police had sufficient evidence to prosecute and the individual responsible had then resigned in 2020.

Prior to the suspension of the Professor of Church History, it had been reported that “Queen’s remained non-committal over calls for change”, despite complaints that the Presbyterian church had become “narrow-minded and backward looking” and associated appeals that Queen’s University “should now sever its relationship” with Union Theological College. The politician and former church elder Lord Alderdice warned that the university risked “reputational damage”. However, the initial suspension of the Professor of Church History pursuant to his radio interview was understood to have then prompted Queen's University Belfast to re-examine its relationship with Union Theological College, subsequently reflected by comments in an ensuing report that the College’s “decisions relating to staff deployment, and late changes affecting the availability of established recognised teachers, highlighted the vulnerability of the University in assuring the academic quality of the student experience”. The Council for Training in Ministry then absolved its own members of any responsibility by denying that they “had any role in this”, and instead held the former professor personally responsible not only for “a significant and material adverse impact” on relations with Queen's University Belfast but also for allegedly bringing the Presbyterian Church in Ireland “into disrepute”, apparently thus exemplifying psychological projection as both scapegoating and victim blaming. Ian Hazlett, Emeritus Professor of Theology and Religious Studies at the University of Glasgow, described the “semi-secret plotting” that led to “Laurence Kirkpatrick’s dismissal from his academic post by non-academic churchmen” as reminiscent of the Inquisition, whilst the erstwhile Professor of Church History himself was convinced that his own remarks on the radio were not the ultimate reasons underlying his dismissal but rather “discrimination and harassment by his employers” because of his prior marital breakdown.

Orange Order use of premises 

During the centennial anniversary year marking partition on the island of Ireland, the college hosted a live-streamed event in September 2021 for an invited audience, with speakers including the Irish Tánaiste Simon Coveney, Sinn Fein Junior Minister Declan Kearney, Northern Ireland First Minister Paul Givan and Democratic Unionist Party leader Sir Jeffrey Donaldson (the latter two both having prominent connections to the Orange Order), thereby publicly commemorating the college’s previous role in hosting the first Parliament of Northern Ireland. However, the college evidently also hosted the Orange Order on a number of separate occasions during the same year, apparently without similarly attempted notification of the broader public at the time.
 
In January 2021, the premises of Union Theological College were made available to the Grand Orange Lodge to film a video of the first of various planned services marking the centennial of partition on the island of Ireland. At this time churches in Northern Ireland had already decided to close in response to increasing cases of COVID-19. In September 2021, Queen’s Orange Society (LOL 1845) held another service in Union Theological College, subsequently parading past Queen’s University. Whereas Union Theological College claims to welcome “students from all backgrounds” whenever advertising its new undergraduate programme with St Mary's University, there is no comparable evidence to date regarding either previous or potential use of the college chapel (nor other college premises) for celebration of Mass.  Indeed, the Presbyterian Church in Ireland requires that professors at the college should subscribe to the Westminster Confession of Faith, which describes the “popish sacrifice of the mass” as “most abominably injurious to Christ's one, only sacrifice”. Meanwhile, the Orange Order has deliberately excluded Roman Catholics from its membership, and it has been a stated requirement that Orange Order members “should strenuously oppose the fatal errors and doctrines of the Church of Rome and other Non-Reformed faiths, and scrupulously avoid countenancing … any act or ceremony of Roman Catholic or other non-Reformed Worship”. Although the Orange Order has been otherwise characterised as “a society with secrets”, a survey of 1,500 participants throughout Northern Ireland in 2011 nevertheless indicated how over 60% of its membership were convinced that “most Catholics are IRA sympathisers”.

New partnerships outside Northern Ireland 
In 2020 Union Theological College announced it would partner with the Roman Catholic St Mary's University, Twickenham for the awarding of undergraduate degrees.  Whereas Union Theological College faced allegations that students “have experienced bullying, as well as sectarian and homophobic attitudes” from its faculty members, St Mary's University had already published resources to tackle homophobic and biphobic bullying in educational contexts, established a network to support LGBTQ+ staff, and works with the students’ union to create an inclusive culture for LGBTQ+ students. However, the Presbyterian Church in Ireland requires that each professor of the college must subscribe to the Westminster Confession of Faith, which states with regard to marriage that those “such as profess the true reformed religion should not marry with infidels, papists, or other idolaters”.  It was therefore expected that the proposed relationship would be met by opposition, as proved to be the case with one anonymous blog. The General Assembly did not meet in 2020 to discuss the proposed partnership (neither meeting in person due to COVID-19 nor online for seemingly undisclosed reasons) but the members of the Assembly authorised a Standing Commission to conduct business on its behalf. In October 2021, the college began advertising a new undergraduate degree on its website, validated by St Mary's University, Twickenham, which is committed to the mission of the Catholic Church in higher education.

Whereas admission of prospective undergraduate students at Union Theological College was previously governed independently by Queen’s University Belfast, applications for the new undergraduate programme are not possible either via UCAS or St Mary's University but must instead be sent by email directly to administrative staff at Union Theological College. The programme of training for ministry in the Presbyterian Church in Ireland is not delivered at Union College alone but also at an unspecified number of “recognised colleges” elsewhere. Postgraduate degrees are now awarded through BibleMesh by the Presbyterian Theological Faculty Ireland. The student retention rate for postgraduate degrees was reported as having been identical to the 100% retention rate for students whose degrees would be conferred by Queen’s University Belfast for residential courses but lower for online courses: 90% on average and as low as 80% for one course to date (where one person out of a class of five dropped out).

While residential courses can be paid for in sterling, all online postgraduate courses through BibleMesh at Union Theological College require payment in United States dollars upon application. Information available for most such courses advertises access (such as through videos) to the teaching by various scholars around the world who are not members of faculty at the college but who also have lectures freely available on YouTube (e.g. Sinclair Ferguson, Fred Sanders, Tremper Longman III, John N. Oswalt, Craig Blomberg, Bruce Longenecker and Mark L. Strauss).

In February 2022, it was announced that support of doctoral candidates at Union Theological College would be outsourced to supervisors in need of mentoring at the Kirby Laing Centre for Public Theology in Cambridge, with the offer of limited availability of competitive scholarships to help defray costs. A further collaboration was announced in January 2023 between Union Theological College and the Davenant Institute's Davenant Hall. Students in Davenant Hall’s M.Litt. degree program will now have the opportunity to continue their studies at the Ph.D. level at Union Theological College, while still being supervised by Davenant Hall faculty. To facilitate this, five of Davenant Hall’s leading instructors (Matthew Hoskin, Joseph Minich, Bradford Littlejohn, Michael Lynch, and Alastair Roberts) will join the faculty of Union Theological College to supervise Ph.D. research within their fields of expertise. Consequently, the locus of expertise has apparently shifted, insofar as most supervised research towards any doctoral qualifications accredited by the Presbyterian Theological Faculty Ireland may take place far away from Union Theological College itself.

Faculty 

The faculty currently comprises two professors respectively leading extant academic departments, a “non-academic” Professor of Ministry, a senior lecturer in Biblical Studies, a lecturer in Historical Theology, a lecturer in New Testament and a lecturer in Practical Theology. Prof. W. Gordon Campbell became principal of the college in 2021.

Notable faculty 

 Dr Martyn C. Cowan (Lecturer in Historical Theology)

Notable former faculty 

 Prof. Henry Cooke (d. 1868)
 Prof. Robert Watts (d. 1895)
 Prof. J. Ernest Davey (d. 1960)
 Prof. Finlay Holmes (d. 2008)
 Prof. Laurence Kirkpatrick (Professor of Church History and former Principal)
 Prof. Stephen N. Williams (Professor Emeritus of Systematic Theology)
Principal J. Stafford Carson (former Principal and Professor of Ministry)

Library 
Founded in 1873 by Mrs Caroline Gamble in memory of her late husband, the Rev. Henry Gamble, the college Library is the largest theological library in Northern Ireland. The Gamble Library stocks over 65,000 books, 20,000 pamphlets and taking over 50 journals and periodicals. The domed library served as the Chamber of the House of Commons for the Northern Ireland Parliament from 1921 to 1932. The foundation of the collection predates the college and was formed in 1845. A significant collection was acquired from the estate of the Presbyterian historian Rev. James Seaton Reid (d. 1851). Much of the Magee College pamphlet collection was added in 1977.

See also 
 :Category:Academics of Union Theological College, Belfast

References

External links

 
 Presbyterian College Celebrates 150 Years, 2003 press release describing the college and its history.
 Queens University Belfast Theology Official site

Bible colleges, seminaries and theological colleges in Northern Ireland
Presbyterian Church in Ireland
Reformed church seminaries and theological colleges
Presbyterian universities and colleges
Presbyterianism in Northern Ireland
Queen's University Belfast
Educational institutions established in 1853
1853 establishments in Ireland
Grade A listed buildings